"Until I Fall Away" is a song by American rock band Gin Blossoms. Released as a single in 1993, it reached number 13 on the US Billboard Modern Rock Tracks chart in 1994. The same year, it peaked at number 34 in Iceland and number 35 in Canada.

Critical response
Billboard called the single "pure pop joy." Ed Masley of The Arizona Republic listed the song as the Gin Blossom's 15th best song on his list of the band's top 30 tracks, writing that the song "certainly holds up as a pure pop song, from its yearning chorus, as a call and response between Wilson (who wrote the song with Valenzuela) and his bandmates, to a brilliantly constructed lead guitar break."

Track listing
US promo CD
 "Until I Fall Away 94" – 3:50
 "Until I Fall Away" (LP version) – 3:51

Charts

References

1992 songs
1993 singles
A&M Records singles
Gin Blossoms songs
Music videos directed by David Hogan
Songs written by Jesse Valenzuela
Songs written by Robin Wilson (musician)